Olsza may refer to the following places in Poland:
Olsza, part of the Grzegórzki and Prądnik Czerwony districts of Kraków
Olsza, Lower Silesian Voivodeship (south-west Poland)
Olsza, Kuyavian-Pomeranian Voivodeship (north-central Poland)
Olsza, Podlaskie Voivodeship (north-east Poland)
Olsza, Łódź Voivodeship (central Poland)
Olsza, Greater Poland Voivodeship (west-central Poland)